Waké Nibombe (born 19 February 1974) is a retired Togolese football goalkeeper. He was a squad member for the 1998 and 2000 African Cup of Nations.

References

1974 births
Living people
Togolese footballers
Togo international footballers
Ashanti Gold SC players
Association football goalkeepers
Togolese expatriate footballers
Expatriate footballers in Ghana
Togolese expatriate sportspeople in Ghana
21st-century Togolese people